3G is the third generation of wireless mobile telecommunications technology. It is the upgrade over 2G, 2.5G, GPRS and 2.75G Enhanced Data Rates for GSM Evolution networks, offering faster data transfer, and better voice quality. This network was superseded by 4G, and later on by 5G. This network is based on a set of standards used for mobile devices and mobile telecommunications use services and networks that comply with the International Mobile Telecommunications-2000 (IMT-2000) specifications by the International Telecommunication Union. 3G finds application in wireless voice telephony, mobile Internet access, fixed wireless Internet access, video calls and mobile TV.

3G telecommunication networks support services that provide an information transfer rate of at least 144 kbit/s. Later 3G releases, often denoted 3.5G and 3.75G, also provide mobile broadband access of several Mbit/s to smartphones and mobile modems in laptop computers. This ensures it can be applied to wireless voice calls, mobile Internet access, fixed wireless Internet access, video calls and mobile TV technologies.

A new generation of cellular standards has appeared approximately every tenth year since 1G systems were introduced in 1979 and the early to mid-1980s. Each generation is characterized by new frequency bands, higher data rates and non–backward-compatible transmission technology. The first commercial 3G networks were introduced in mid-2001.

Overview 
Several telecommunications companies market wireless mobile Internet services as 3G, indicating that the advertised service is provided over a 3G wireless network. Services advertised as 3G are required to meet IMT-2000 technical standards, including standards for reliability and speed (data transfer rates). To meet the IMT-2000 standards, a system must provide peak data rates of at least 144 kbit/s. However, many services advertised as 3G provide higher speed than the minimum technical requirements for a 3G service. Subsequent 3G releases, denoted 3.5G and 3.75G, provided mobile broadband access of several Mbit/s for smartphones and mobile modems in laptop computers.

3G branded standards:
The UMTS (Universal Mobile Telecommunications System) system, standardized by 3GPP in 2001, was used in Europe, Japan, China (with a different radio interface) and other regions predominated by GSM (Global Systems for Mobile) 2G system infrastructure. The cell phones are typically UMTS and GSM hybrids. Several radio interfaces are offered, sharing the same infrastructure:
 The original and most widespread radio interface is called W-CDMA (Wideband Code Division Multiple Access).
 The TD-SCDMA radio interface was commercialized in 2009 and only offered in China.
 The latest UMTS release, HSPA+, can provide peak data rates up to 56 Mbit/s in the downlink in theory (28 Mbit/s in existing services) and 22 Mbit/s in the uplink.
The CDMA2000 system, first offered in 2002, standardized by 3GPP2, used especially in North America and South Korea, sharing infrastructure with the IS-95 2G standard. The cell phones are typically CDMA2000 and IS-95 hybrids. The latest release EVDO Rev. B offers peak rates of 14.7 Mbit/s downstream.

The 3G systems and radio interfaces are based on spread spectrum radio transmission technology. While the GSM EDGE standard ("2.9G"), DECT cordless phones and Mobile WiMAX standards formally also fulfill the IMT-2000 requirements and are approved as 3G standards by ITU, these are typically not branded as 3G and are based on completely different technologies.

The common standards complying with the IMT2000/3G standard are:
 EDGE, a revision by the 3GPP organization to the older 2G GSM based transmission methods, which utilizes the same switching nodes, base station sites, and frequencies as GPRS, but includes a new base station and cellphone RF circuits. It is based on the three times as efficient 8PSK modulation scheme as a supplement to the original GMSK modulation scheme. EDGE is still used extensively due to its ease of upgrade from existing 2G GSM infrastructure and cell phones.
 EDGE combined with the GPRS 2.5G technology is called EGPRS, and allows peak data rates in the order of 200 kbit/s, just like the original UMTS WCDMA versions and thus formally fulfill the IMT2000 requirements on 3G systems. However, in practice, EDGE is seldom marketed as a 3G system, but a 2.9G system. EDGE shows slightly better system spectral efficiency than the original UMTS and CDMA2000 systems, but it is difficult to reach much higher peak data rates due to the limited GSM spectral bandwidth of 200 kHz, and it is thus a dead end.
 EDGE was also a mode in the IS-136 TDMA system, no longer used.
 Evolved EDGE, the latest revision, has peaks of 1 Mbit/s downstream and 400 kbit/s upstream but is not commercially used.
 The Universal Mobile Telecommunications System, created and revised by the 3GPP. The family is a full revision from GSM in terms of encoding methods and hardware, although some GSM sites can be retrofitted to broadcast in the UMTS/W-CDMA format.
 W-CDMA is the most common deployment, commonly operated on the 2,100 MHz band. A few others use the 850, 900, and 1,900 MHz bands.
 HSPA is an amalgamation of several upgrades to the original W-CDMA standard and offers speeds of 14.4 Mbit/s down and 5.76 Mbit/s up. HSPA is backward-compatible and uses the same frequencies as W-CDMA.
 HSPA+, a further revision and upgrade of HSPA, can provide theoretical peak data rates up to 168 Mbit/s in the downlink and 22 Mbit/s in the uplink, using a combination of air interface improvements as well as multi-carrier HSPA and MIMO. Technically though, MIMO and DC-HSPA can be used without the "+" enhancements of HSPA+.
 The CDMA2000 system, or IS-2000, including CDMA2000 1x and CDMA2000 High Rate Packet Data (or EVDO), standardized by 3GPP2 (differing from the 3GPP), evolving from the original IS-95 CDMA system, is used especially in North America, China, India, Pakistan, Japan, South Korea, Southeast Asia, Europe, and Africa.
 CDMA2000 1x Rev. E has an increased voice capacity (by three times the original amount) compared to Rev. 0 EVDO Rev. B offers downstream peak rates of 14.7 Mbit/s while Rev. C enhanced existing and new terminal user experience.

While DECT cordless phones and Mobile WiMAX standards formally also fulfill the IMT-2000 requirements, they are not usually considered due to their rarity and unsuitability for usage with mobile phones.

Break-up of 3G systems 

The 3G (UMTS and CDMA2000) research and development projects started in 1992. In 1999, ITU approved five radio interfaces for IMT-2000 as a part of the ITU-R M.1457 Recommendation; WiMAX was added in 2007.

There are evolutionary standards (EDGE and CDMA) that are backward-compatible extensions to pre-existing 2G networks as well as revolutionary standards that require all-new network hardware and frequency allocations. The cell phones use UMTS in combination with 2G GSM standards and bandwidths, but do not support EDGE. The latter group is the UMTS family, which consists of standards developed for IMT-2000, as well as the independently developed standards DECT and WiMAX, which were included because they fit the IMT-2000 definition.

While EDGE fulfills the 3G specifications, most GSM/UMTS phones report EDGE ("2.75G") and UMTS ("3G") functionality.

History 
3G technology was the result of research and development work carried out by the International Telecommunication Union (ITU) in the early 1980s. 3G specifications and standards were developed in fifteen years. The technical specifications were made available to the public under the name IMT-2000. The communication spectrum between 400 MHz to 3 GHz was allocated for 3G. Both the government and communication companies approved the 3G standard.  The first pre-commercial 3G network was launched by NTT DoCoMo in Japan in 1998, branded as FOMA. It was first available in May 2001 as a pre-release (test) of W-CDMA technology. The first commercial launch of 3G was also by NTT DoCoMo in Japan on 1 October 2001, although it was initially somewhat limited in scope; broader availability of the system was delayed by apparent concerns over its reliability.

The first European pre-commercial network was an UMTS network on the Isle of Man by Manx Telecom, the operator then owned by British Telecom, and the first commercial network (also UMTS based W-CDMA) in Europe was opened for business by Telenor in December 2001 with no commercial handsets and thus no paying customers.

The first network to go commercially live was by SK Telecom in South Korea on the CDMA-based 1xEV-DO technology in January 2002. By May 2002, the second South Korean 3G network was by KT on EV-DO and thus the South Koreans were the first to see competition among 3G operators.

The first commercial United States 3G network was by Monet Mobile Networks, on CDMA2000 1x EV-DO technology, but the network provider later shut down operations. The second 3G network operator in the USA was Verizon Wireless in July 2002, also on CDMA2000 1x EV-DO. AT&T Mobility was also a true 3G UMTS network, having completed its upgrade of the 3G network to HSUPA.

The first commercial United Kingdom 3G network was started by Hutchison Telecom which was originally behind Orange S.A. In 2003, it announced first commercial third generation or 3G mobile phone network in the UK.

The first pre-commercial demonstration network in the southern hemisphere was built in Adelaide, South Australia, by m.Net Corporation in February 2002 using UMTS on 2100 MHz. This was a demonstration network for the 2002 IT World Congress. The first commercial 3G network was launched by Hutchison Telecommunications branded as Three or "3" in June 2003.

In India, on 11 December 2008, the first 3G mobile and internet services were launched by a state-owned company, Mahanagar Telecom Nigam Limited (MTNL), within the metropolitan cities of Delhi and Mumbai. After MTNL, another state-owned company, Bharat Sanchar Nigam Limited (BSNL), began deploying the 3G networks country-wide.

Emtel launched the first 3G network in Africa.

Adoption 
Japan was one of the first countries to adopt 3G, the reason being the process of 3G spectrum allocation, which in Japan was awarded without much upfront cost. The frequency spectrum was allocated in the US and Europe based on auctioning, thereby requiring a huge initial investment for any company wishing to provide 3G services. European companies collectively paid over 100 billion dollars in their spectrum auctions.

Nepal Telecom adopted 3G Service for the first time in southern Asia. However, its 3G was relatively slow to be adopted in Nepal. In some instances, 3G networks do not use the same radio frequencies as 2G, so mobile operators must build entirely new networks and license entirely new frequencies, especially to achieve high data transmission rates. Other countries' delays were due to the expenses of upgrading transmission hardware, especially for UMTS, whose deployment required the replacement of most broadcast towers. Due to these issues and difficulties with deployment, many carriers could not or delayed the acquisition of these updated capabilities.

In December 2007, 190 3G networks were operating in 40 countries and 154 HSDPA networks were operating in 71 countries, according to the Global Mobile Suppliers Association (GSA). In Asia, Europe, Canada, and the US, telecommunication companies use W-CDMA technology with the support of around 100 terminal designs to operate 3G mobile networks.

The roll-out of 3G networks was delayed by the enormous costs of additional spectrum licensing fees in some countries. The license fees in some European countries were particularly high, bolstered by government auctions of a limited number of licenses and sealed bid auctions, and initial excitement over 3G's potential. This led to a telecoms crash that ran concurrently with similar crashes in the fibre-optic and dot.com fields.

The 3G standard is perhaps well known because of a massive expansion of the mobile communications market post-2G and advances of the consumer mobile phone. An especially notable development during this time is the smartphone (for example, the iPhone, and the Android family), combining the abilities of a PDA with a mobile phone, leading to widespread demand for mobile internet connectivity. 3G has also introduced the term "mobile broadband" because its speed and capability made it a viable alternative for internet browsing, and USB Modems connecting to 3G networks, and now 4G became increasingly common.

Market penetration 
By June 2007, the 200 millionth 3G subscriber had been connected of which 10 million were in Nepal and 8.2 million in India. This 200 millionth is only 6.7% of the 3 billion mobile phone subscriptions worldwide. (When counting CDMA2000 1x RTT customers—max bitrate 72% of the 200 kbit/s which defines 3G—the total size of the nearly-3G subscriber base was 475 million as of June 2007, which was 15.8% of all subscribers worldwide.) In the countries where 3G was launched first – Japan and South Korea – 3G penetration is over 70%. In Europe the leading country for 3G penetration is Italy with a third of its subscribers migrated to 3G. Other leading countries for 3G use include Nepal, UK, Austria, Australia and Singapore at the 32% migration level.

According to ITU estimates, as of Q4 2012 there were 2096 million active mobile-broadband subscribers worldwide out of a total of 6835 million subscribers—this is just over 30%.  About half the mobile-broadband subscriptions are for subscribers in developed nations, 934 million out of 1600 million total, well over 50%. Note however that there is a distinction between a phone with mobile-broadband connectivity and a smart phone with a large display and so on—although according to the ITU and informatandm.com the USA has 321 million mobile subscriptions, including 256 million that are 3G or 4G, which is both 80% of the subscriber base and 80% of the USA population, according to ComScore just a year earlier in Q4 2011 only about 42% of people surveyed in the USA reported they owned a smart phone.  In Japan, 3G penetration was similar at about 81%, but smart phone ownership was lower at about 17%. In China, there were 486.5 million 3G subscribers in June 2014, in a population of 1,385,566,537 (2013 UN estimate).

Decline and decommissions 

Since the increasing adoption of 4G networks across the globe, 3G use has been in decline. Several operators around the world have already or are in the process of shutting down their 3G networks (see table below). In several places, 3G is being shut down while its older predecessor 2G is being kept in operation; Vodafone Europe is doing this, citing 2G's usefulness as a low-power fall-back. EE in the UK have indicated that they plan to phase out 3G by 2023 with the spectrum being used to enhance 5G capacity.

Currently 3G around the world is declining in availability and support. Technology that depends on 3G for usage will soon become inoperable in many places. For example, the European Union plans to ensure that member countries maintain 2G networks as a fallback, so 3G devices that are backwards compatible with 2G frequencies can continue to be used. However, in countries that plan to decommission 2G networks as well, such as the United States, devices supporting only 3G and backwards compatible with 2G will soon be inoperable. As of February 2022, less than 1% of cell phone customers in the United States used 3G; AT&T offered free replacement devices to some customers in the run-up to its shutdown.

Patents 
It has been estimated that there are almost 8,000 patents declared essential (FRAND) related to the 483 technical specifications which form the 3GPP and 3GPP2 standards. Twelve companies accounted in 2004 for 90% of the patents (Qualcomm, Ericsson, Nokia, Motorola, Philips, NTT DoCoMo, Siemens, Mitsubishi, Fujitsu, Hitachi, InterDigital, and Matsushita).

Even then, some patents essential to 3G might not have been declared by their patent holders. It is believed that Nortel and Lucent have undisclosed patents essential to these standards.

Furthermore, the existing 3G Patent Platform Partnership Patent pool has little impact on FRAND protection because it excludes the four largest patent owners for 3G.

Features

Data rates 
ITU has not provided a clear definition of the data rate that users can expect from 3G equipment or providers. Thus users sold 3G service may not be able to point to a standard and say that the rates it specifies are not being met.  While stating in commentary that "it is expected that IMT-2000 will provide higher transmission rates: a minimum data rate of 2 Mbit/s for stationary or walking users, and 348 kbit/s in a moving vehicle," the ITU does not actually clearly specify minimum required rates, nor required average rates, nor what modes of the interfaces qualify as 3G, so various data rates are sold as '3G' in the market.

In a market implementation, 3G downlink data speeds defined by telecom service providers vary depending on the underlying technology deployed; up to 384kbit/s for UMTS (WCDMA), up to 7.2Mbit/sec for HSPA, and a theoretical maximum of 21.1 Mbit/s for HSPA+ and 42.2 Mbit/s for DC-HSPA+ (technically 3.5G, but usually clubbed under the tradename of 3G).

Compare data speeds with 3.5G and 4G.

Security 

3G networks offer greater security than their 2G predecessors. By allowing the UE (User Equipment) to authenticate the network it is attaching to, the user can be sure the network is the intended one and not an impersonator. 3G networks use the KASUMI block cipher instead of the older A5/1 stream cipher. However, a number of serious weaknesses in the KASUMI cipher have been identified.

In addition to the 3G network infrastructure security, end-to-end security is offered when application frameworks such as IMS are accessed, although this is not strictly a 3G property.

Applications of 3G 
The bandwidth and location information available to 3G devices gives rise to applications not previously available to mobile phone users. It became possible to conveniently surf the internet on a 3G network on the go with minimum hassle, and do many other tasks previously a slow and difficult hassle on 2G. Medical devices, fire alarms, ankle monitors use this network for accomplishing their designated tasks alongside mobile phone users. This network marked the first for a cellular communications network to be used in such a wide variety of tasks, kick-starting the beginning of widespread usage of cellular networks.

Evolution 
Both 3GPP and 3GPP2 are working on the extensions to 3G standards that are based on an all-IP network infrastructure and using advanced wireless technologies such as MIMO. These specifications already display features characteristic for IMT-Advanced (4G), the successor of 3G. However, falling short of the bandwidth requirements for 4G (which is 1 Gbit/s for stationary and 100 Mbit/s for mobile operation), these standards are classified as 3.9G or Pre-4G.
3GPP plans to meet the 4G goals with LTE Advanced, whereas Qualcomm has halted UMB development in favour of the LTE family.

On 14 December 2009, TeliaSonera announced in an official press release that "We are very proud to be the first operator in the world to offer our customers 4G services." With the launch of their LTE network, initially they are offering pre-4G (or beyond 3G) services in Stockholm, Sweden and Oslo, Norway.

Phase out

See also 
 List of mobile phone generations
 Mobile radio telephone (also known as "0G")
 Mobile broadband
 Wireless device radiation and health
 1G
 2G
 4G
 5G
 LTE (telecommunication)

References

External links 
 

Computer-related introductions in 2001
Japanese inventions
Mobile telecommunications
Software-defined radio
Videotelephony
Wireless communication systems